Doug Long (28 March 1940 – 9 February 2009) was an Australian rules footballer who played for Geelong in the Victorian Football League (VFL) and Glenelg in the South Australian National Football League (SANFL).

A ruckman from South Gambier, Long spent five seasons with Geelong and participated in their 1961 Night Premiership win. He moved to South Australia in 1962, having been appointed captain-coach of Glenelg, despite only turning 22 at the start of the season. After steering the club to fifth position that year, Glenelg fell to seventh in 1963 and he was replaced by Len Fitzgerald. He continued to give Glenelg good service as a player and was often used at full-back when Neil Kerley was coach later in the decade. A seven time South Australian interstate representative, Long was inducted into Glenelg's 'Hall of Fame' in 2006.

References

Holmesby, Russell and Main, Jim (2007). The Encyclopedia of AFL Footballers. 7th ed. Melbourne: Bas Publishing.

External links

1940 births
Geelong Football Club players
Glenelg Football Club players
Glenelg Football Club coaches
Australian rules footballers from South Australia
2009 deaths